is a Japanese musician, singer and actor. As of 2012, he is the only male actor to have received both the Japan Record Award and the Japan Academy Award for Outstanding Performance by an Actor in a Leading Role.

Early life
Terao was born in Yokohama (Kanagawa prefecture) in Japan, son of the actor and film director Jūkichi Uno. He attended schools Wako Gakuen, Hosei University Daini Senior High School, and graduated from the vocational school Bunka Gakuin.

Career

Singing career
In 1966, he debuted as a bassist of a group sounds band called The Savage (ザ・サベージ). His solo debut album came out in 1970.

As a singer, Terao is known mostly for the 1981 hit song  and the album it was part of named , which sold 1.6 million copies in Japan.

Acting career
As an actor, he debuted in The Sands of Kurobe, a film directed by Kei Kumai in 1968. In 1985, Terao worked under director Akira Kurosawa in Ran. Five years later he appeared as "I" in Kurosawa's Dreams. He has worked with director Takashi Koizumi in After the Rain and The Professor's Beloved Equation. As for dramas, Terao has acted with Kazunari Ninomiya in Yasashii Jikan as well as in the latest Takuya Kimura-helmed drama, Change (spring 2008). He won the award for best actor at the 47th Blue Ribbon Awards for Half a Confession. The promotional agencies to which he has belonged are Horipro, Ishihara International Productions, Inc. and his current personal agency Terao Music Offices (寺尾音楽事務所).

Personal life

He was married to Bunjaku Han from 1973 to 1974 (ending in divorce). His current wife is Mayumi Hoshino. Terao is known for wearing sunglasses and for his expressions of nihilism. Because he has two moles on one cheek, he has the nickname of "hoppe" (ボッペ), meaning "cheek".

Filmography

Films
 The Sands of Kurobe (1968)
 Tora-san's Sunrise and Sunset (1976)
 Ran (1985) – Ichimonji Taro Takatora
 Rock yo shizukani nagareyo (1988)
 Dreams (1990) – "I"
 Madadayo (1993) - Sawamura 
 After the Rain (1999) – Ihei Misawa
 Letters from the Mountains (2002) - Takao Ueda
 Casshern (2004) – Professor Kotaro Azuma
 Half a Confession (2004) – Soichiro Kaji
 Into the Sun (2005) – Matsuda
 The Professor's Beloved Equation (2006) - the professor
 The Hovering Blade (2009) – Shigeki Nagamine
 Fragments of the Last Will (2022) – old Ken'ichi Yamamoto
 Mom, Is That You?! (2023)

Television
 Kunitori Monogatari (1973) – Tokugawa Ieyasu
 Daitokai Series (1976–1979) – He was in only the 1st and 3rd seasons of the show.
 Seibu Keisatsu (1979) –  Takeshi Matsuda, but prefers to be called 'Rikki' by his colleagues. His character is killed in the line of duty in the 123rd episode of Part I of the show.
 Taiyō ni Hoero! Part2 (1986)
 Gunshi Kanbei (2014) – Tokugawa Ieyasu
 Nobunaga Moyu (2016) – Konoe Sakihisa
 Kohaku (2017) – Toshio Arai
 Rikuoh (2017) – Haruyuki Iiyama
 Shiroi Kyotō (2019) – Professor Azuma

Discography

 Reflections (1981)
 Atmosphere (1983)
 Standard (1987)

Honours
Medal with Purple Ribbon (2008)
Order of the Rising Sun, 4th Class, Gold Rays with Rosette (2018)

References

External links 
 

1947 births
Japanese bass guitarists
Japanese male singers
Living people
People from Yokohama
Musicians from Kanagawa Prefecture
Recipients of the Medal with Purple Ribbon
Recipients of the Order of the Rising Sun, 4th class
Male bass guitarists